Arbuthnot Latham & Co is a private and merchant bank based near Moorgate in the City of London. It has the status of one of the 12 accepting houses.

History
Arbuthnot Latham was founded on 13 May 1833 by Alfred Latham and John A. Arbuthnot at 33 Great St Helen’s, Lime Street (near The Gherkin) in the City of London. Originally starting as a general merchant business, it soon began involving itself in finance and lending operations.

In 1981 the Arbuthnot family's involvement with the bank ended, with its purchase by Dow Scandia; a consortium majority owned by the Dow Chemical Company. It was at this time that Henry Angest joined the bank. Shortly afterwards, Dow had sold Arbuthnot Latham.

By 1990, the business had had four separate owners and the Arbuthnot Latham name had been retired. After successfully leading the management buyout of Secure Homes (later renamed Secure Trust), Henry Angest acquired Arbuthnot Fund Managers (and thereby the Arbuthnot Latham name) in 1991, and then in 1994 acquired Aitken Hume Bank for an estimated £3.2million. In August 1994, Aitken Hume Bank was renamed Arbuthnot Latham & Co.

In July 2018, the company appointed Andrew Salmon as CEO.

Operations
Arbuthnot Latham focuses on three primary businesses practices: Private Banking, Commercial Banking, and Wealth Management. In addition to this, as of March 2021 Arbuthnot offers 'Bounce Back Loans' as part of the Bounce Back Loans Scheme (BBLS).

Private Banking 
Arbuthnot's Private Banking business is structured as follows:
Executives & Entrepreneurs
Sports, Media & Entertainment
Specialist
Treasury

Arbuthnot Latham Manchester, which has a large private banking client book, grew its balance sheet from £20m in 2016 to over £300m in 2021.

Commercial Banking 
Arbuthnot's Commercial Banking business is structured as follows: 
Lending Solutions
Buy to Let
Real Estate Finance
Media
Specialists
Asset Based Lending
Arbuthnot Specialist Finance
Renaissance Asset Finance

In 2019, Arbuthnot Latham was the winner of City A.M.'s Bank of the Year award (originally known as the Retail Bank of the Year award), beating Monzo, OakNorth, Barclays, and Credit Suisse.

Wealth Management 
Arbuthnot's Wealth Management business is structured as follows:
Investment Management
Wealth Planning
Retirement Planning

In November 2020, Arbuthnot's Investment arm one WealthBriefing MENA Awards for Excellence "Best Private Bank – Discretionary Fund Management (DFM) Offering" award.

Locations
For the entirety of its existence, Arbuthnot Latham (including its predecessor companies) have been headquartered in the City of London. From 2004 to 2014, Arbuthnot was based in Ropemaker Street; one of the former ‘rope walks’ that existed on the outskirts of medieval London. The location Arbuthnot chose to base itself during this period was very close to the City's skyscraper, CityPoint. In 2014, Arbuthnot Latham acquired the freehold of a property in Wilson Street, in the Bishopsgate area of the City, and moved its headquarters to that location.

Outside of its Central London footprint, Arbuthnot Latham currently has offices in Gatwick, Manchester, Exeter, and Bristol. Until 2021, Arbuthnot had an international office based in the International Financial Centre in Dubai. The closure of this office was partially attributed to the collapse in Arbuthnot's earnings as a result of the COVID-19 pandemic.

Details
The bank is part of the "Arbuthnot Banking Group" (previously known as Secure Trust Banking Group), which is quoted on the Alternative Investment Market (AIM); it was previously listed on the London Stock Exchange.  It offers banking, investment management and wealth planning services to both high net worth private individuals and commercial clients.

See also

List of banks
List of banks in United Kingdom

References

External links

Group website
YouTube channel

Banks of the United Kingdom
Arbuthnot Latham
Banks established in 1833
Banks based in the City of London
1833 establishments in England
Banking in Great Britain
Organisations based in the City of London